The list of ship commissionings in 1922 includes a chronological list of all of the ships that were commissioned in 1922.


References

See also 

1922
 Ship commissionings